Mand Surakhpur  is a village in Kapurthala district of Punjab State, India. The village is administrated by a Sarpanch, who is an elected representative.

Demography 
According to the report published by Census India in 2011, Mand Surakhpur has 24 houses with the total population of 129 persons of which 65 are male and 64 females. Literacy rate of  Mand Surakhpur is 79.17%, higher than the state average of 75.84%.  The population of children in the age group 0–6 years is 9 which is 6.98% of the total population. Child sex ratio is approximately 125, lower than the state average of 846.

Population data

References

External links
  Villages in Kapurthala
 Kapurthala Villages List

Villages in Kapurthala district